Mary Hughes  (1874–1958) was the second wife of Billy Hughes, Prime Minister of Australia.

Mary Hughes may also refer to:

Mary Vivian Hughes (1866–1956), British author and educator
Mary Beth Hughes (1919–1995), American actress
Mary Hughes (social worker) (1860–1941), British social worker
Mary Hughes (British author), British author and teacher 
Mary Hughes (bowls), lawn bowls competitor for Wales

See also
Hughes (surname)